Edgar Paul Akouokou (born 20 December 1997) is an Ivorian professional footballer who plays as a defensive midfielder for La Liga club Real Betis and the Ivory Coast national football team.

Club career
Akouokou started his career with Finnish side Ekenäs IF in 2016. In January 2017, he went on a trial at Ligue 1 side Angers SCO,

On 27 August 2017, Akouokou moved to Israeli Premier League side Beitar Jerusalem, on loan until May 2018. The following 1 February, after being sparingly used, he moved to Hapoel Rishon LeZion of the Liga Leumit, also in a temporary deal.

On 21 November 2018, Akouokou switched teams and countries again after agreeing to a deal with La Liga side Real Betis; he was initially assigned to the reserves in Tercera División. On 10 September 2020, after helping the B-team achieve promotion to Segunda División B, he renewed his contract until 2024 and was promoted to the first team.

Career statistics

Club

Honours
Betis
Copa del Rey: 2021–22

References

External links
Profile at the Real Betis website

1997 births
Living people
Footballers from Abidjan
Ivorian footballers
Association football midfielders
Ykkönen players
Ekenäs IF players
Israeli Premier League players
Liga Leumit players
Beitar Jerusalem F.C. players
Hapoel Rishon LeZion F.C. players
La Liga players
Tercera División players
Betis Deportivo Balompié footballers
Real Betis players
Ivorian expatriate footballers
Ivorian expatriate sportspeople in Finland
Ivorian expatriate sportspeople in Israel
Ivorian expatriate sportspeople in Spain
Expatriate footballers in Finland
Expatriate footballers in Israel
Expatriate footballers in Spain
Ivory Coast international footballers